Haibane Renmei is a Japanese animated television series. It was directed by Tomokazu Tokoro, animated by the Japanese animation studio Radix, and produced by Yasuyuki Ueda. The episodes are based on the brief dōjinshi  by Yoshitoshi ABe, expanding on the original concepts over thirteen episodes. ABe also wrote the screenplay for the anime. The plot of the episodes follows Rakka, a girl who hatches from a cocoon in a strange town with no memory of who she was before.

The episodes aired from October 9, 2002 to December 18, 2002 on Animax and Fuji Television. The first five ran two weeks apart, and the remaining eight were shown weekly in back-to-back pairs.

Geneon, Haibane Renmei'''s Japanese distributor, also owned the license for the series' English release in the United States until it was acquired by Funimation in 2010. MVM Films owns distribution rights in the United Kingdom and Madman Entertainment owns them in Australia and New Zealand.

Two pieces of theme music are used for the episodes; one opening theme and one closing theme. The opening theme is "Free Bird" by Kow Otani and the closing theme is "Blue Flow" by Masumi Itō with Heart of Air. The soundtrack album, Hanenone, was released on December 30, 2002 in Japan and August 5, 2003 in the United States.

Episode list

Volume DVDs

Japanese releases
In Japan, Geneon released a total of 5 DVD compilations of Haibane Renmei between December 21, 2002 and April 25, 2003. Instead of being called "discs," these releases were labelled "COG.1," "COG.2," etc. A complete three-disc boxed set was released on November 21, 2004.

North American releases
In the United States, Geneon released 4 DVD compilations of Haibane Renmei'', each with its own title, between August 26, 2003 and February 24, 2004. The first disc was available either on its own or with a storage box for the series; the four discs were released together as a box set on November 21, 2004. In 2012, Funimation re-released the series in a 2-disc set under their Anime Classics label.

References

External links
 Official website for the anime series

Haibane Renmei